The World Radiation Monitoring Center (WRMC) is the central archive of all Baseline Surface Radiation Network measurements. In 1992 the WRMC was founded at ETH Zurich. Since 2008-07-01 the WRMC is hosted by the Alfred Wegener Institute. Data were transferred to AWI from the original ftp-site at ETH Zurich until about 2008-03-01. More recent data were submitted directly to AWI were all data are archived in the ftp-server. Additionally, data are available via PANGAEA - Data Publisher for Earth & Environmental Science. 

The data within the WRMC are read account restricted. Only persons who follow the BSRN data release guidelines are allowed to use the data. Read accounts for both - PANGAEA and ftp access - can be obtained from the WRMC for free.

Climatological research